Adam Peter Cole (born 4 May 1974) is an English former cricketer. He was a right-handed batsman who bowled right-arm fast-medium.  He was born in Norwich, Norfolk.

Cole made his debut for Norfolk in the 1993 MCCA Knockout Trophy against Bedfordshire, his only appearance for the county in that competition. He played Minor Counties cricket for Norfolk from 1993 to 1994, which included six Minor Counties Championship matches. It was for Norfolk that he made his debut in List A cricket against Warwickshire in the 1993 NatWest Trophy, playing a further match in that format for the county in the 1994 NatWest Trophy against Worcestershire.

He later joined Buckinghamshire, making his debut for the county in the 1998 MCCA Knockout Trophy against Berkshire. He played Minor Counties cricket for the county from 1998 to 2000, which included 14 Minor Counties Championship matches and eight MCCA Knockout Trophy matches. He also played a single List A match for Buckinghamshire against Surrey in the 1998 NatWest Trophy.

Cole also played Second XI cricket for the Essex Second XI, Sussex Second XI, Hampshire Second XI and Worcestershire Second XI.

References

External links
Adam Cole at ESPNcricinfo
Adam Cole at CricketArchive

1974 births
Living people
Cricketers from Norwich
English cricketers
Norfolk cricketers
Buckinghamshire cricketers